The 2023 Richmond Spiders football team will represent the University of Richmond as a member of the Colonial Athletic Association (CAA) in the 2023 NCAA Division I FCS football season. The Spiders are led by seventh-year head coach Russ Huesman and play home games at E. Claiborne Robins Stadium in Richmond, Virginia.

Previous season

The Spiders finished the 2022 season with an overall record of 9–4, 6–2 CAA play to finish in a tie for second place. They lost 38–31 to Sacramento State in the NCAA Division I Second Round.

Schedule

References

Richmond
Richmond Spiders football seasons
Richmond Spiders football